Los Centenarios is a census-designated place (CDP) in Webb County, Texas, United States. This was a new CDP for the 2010 census with a population of 87.

Geography
Los Centenarios is located at  (27.612260, -99.212988).

Education
Residents are in the United Independent School District. Zoned schools include: Dr. Henry Cuellar Elementary School, Antonio Gonzalez Middle School, United South High School.

The designated community college for Webb County is Laredo Community College.

References

Census-designated places in Webb County, Texas
Census-designated places in Texas